Adrian Ropotan (born 8 May 1986) is a Romanian former footballer who played as a midfielder.

Career
Adrian Ropotan was born in Galați on 8 May 1986, playing his first Divizia A match for Dinamo București on 18 March 2006 in a 2–0 victory against Pandurii Târgu Jiu. In the following season, he played 21 league games under coach Mircea Rednic, helping Dinamo win the 2006–07 Liga I title, also appearing in 8 matches in the UEFA Cup as the team reached the sixteenths-finals where they were eliminated with 3–1 on aggregate by Benfica. Ropotan was transferred to Dynamo Moscow for 3 million euros on 13 February 2009. In 2011 he was loaned by Dynamo Moscow to Tom Tomsk where he played alongside fellow Romanian Ovidiu Dănănae. After the loan ended, Ropotan returned to Dynamo Moscow where he worked with Romanian coach Dan Petrescu. After his contract with Dynamo Moscow expired, he signed for Volga as a free agent where he was teammate with fellow Romanian Mihăiță Pleșan. On 22 June 2014 Ropotan signed a one-year contract with Gabala, being brought there alongside Andrei Cristea by coach Dorinel Munteanu. In the 2015–16 season, Ropotan returned to Romania, playing in the first part of the season for Petrolul Ploiești and in the second for Pandurii Târgu Jiu. He went to play in the United Arab Emirates for Hatta Club together with former Pandurii teammate Mihai Răduț. Ropotan ended his career after playing in the 2018–19 Liga I season for Concordia Chiajna, being brought there by coach Dorinel Munteanu.

International career
Adrian Ropotan played 7 games for Romania, making his debut on 19 November 2008, when coach Victor Pițurcă sent him on the field in order to replace Costin Lazăr at halftime in a friendly which ended with a 2–1 victory against Georgia. He appeared in two games at the Euro 2012 qualifiers, a 2–1 away loss against Bosnia and Herzegovina and a 3–1 home victory against Luxembourg. His last appearance for the national team was on 25 May 2016 in a friendly against DR Congo which ended 1–1.

Statistics

Club

International

Statistics accurate as of match played 29 March 2011

Honours
Dinamo București
Liga I: 2006–07

References

External links
 
 
 
 
 
 

1986 births
Living people
Sportspeople from Galați
Romanian footballers
Association football midfielders
FCM Dunărea Galați players
FC Argeș Pitești players
FC Dinamo București players
FC Dynamo Moscow players
FC Tom Tomsk players
FC Volga Nizhny Novgorod players
Gabala FC players
Hatta Club players
FC Petrolul Ploiești players
CS Pandurii Târgu Jiu players
CS Concordia Chiajna players
Liga I players
Liga II players
Russian Premier League players
Azerbaijan Premier League players
UAE Pro League players
Expatriate footballers in the United Arab Emirates
Romanian expatriate footballers
Expatriate footballers in Russia
Expatriate footballers in Azerbaijan
Romania international footballers